Matt Reid and John-Patrick Smith were the defending champions but chose not to defend their title.

Gijs Brouwer and Reese Stalder won the title after defeating Hans Hach Verdugo and Miguel Ángel Reyes-Varela 6–4, 6–4 in the final.

Seeds

Draw

References

External links
 Main draw

Puerto Vallarta Open - Doubles